Football Manager 2017 (abbreviated to FM17) is a football management simulation video game developed by Sports Interactive and published by Sega. It was released on Microsoft Windows, macOS and Linux on 4 November 2016. It is the fourteenth iterative instalment to the Football Manager series.

Gameplay

FM17 features similar gameplay to that of the Football Manager series. Gameplay consists of taking charge of a professional association football team, as the team manager. Players can sign football players to contracts, manage finances for the club, and give team talks to players. FM17 is a simulation of real world management, with the player being judged on various factors by the club's AI owners and board.

Development

After the United Kingdom voted to leave the European Union (EU) on 23 June 2016, FM17 featured a form of brexit, with three possible scenarios: "business as usual" with no additional work visas needed; current players will be grandfathered but new players will need work visas; or a "hard Brexit" in-game scenario, which has Scotland voting for independence in a second referendum and remaining in the EU, whilst EU players would require working visas to play in any English, Welsh or Northern Irish teams.

FM17 featured a new social media view, which would show a Twitter themed view of fans and players thoughts, that would change after events that transpired in game. A new face scanning option allowed the player's in-game avatar to be customised to show a 3D view of the player's real life face by use of a webcam, or brought from a picture.

Reception

On the review aggregator Metacritic, Football Manager 2017 received a score of 80 out of 100, based on 47 critics, indicating "generally favorable reviews". GameSpot gave the game a 7/10, applauding the player development and smart transfers, and also saying "Football Manager 2017 is easy to recommend to the budding manager", but not enjoying the tactics interface. PC Gamer gave the game a score of 85/100, saying the game is a significant step up from previous versions. Trusted Reviews gave the game 4.5 stars, "saying FM17 is a very definite leap forward."

George Osborn of British newspaper, The Guardian, was less positive about the game, particularly citing previous releases in the series, and the lack of a substantial increase over previous instalments. Osborn wrote, "Over the past four years, Football Manager editions have shaken up the way players create tactics, introduce in game manager stats or provide new game modes to play. FM 2017 offers none of that." Osborn was also highly critical of the game's purely cosmetic addition of a face scanner, and inclusion of social media, calling it "utterly inconsequential".

User reviews of the game on the Steam service, however, show a "Mostly Negative" view, the result of a backlash from Chinese users protesting at the lack of an official translation in their language.

Sales
On 21 August 2017 PC Games Insider magazine published that FM17 had sold its one-millionth copy. This would be the fifth time in succession that the Football Manager game had sold one million copies or more.

References

External links

2017
2016 video games
Brexit in fiction
Sega video games
Windows games
MacOS games
Linux games
Video games developed in the United Kingdom